The 1936–1937 Flint sit-down strike, also known as the General Motors sit-down strike, the great GM sit-down strike, and so on, was a sitdown strike at the General Motors plant in Flint, Michigan, United States. It changed the United Automobile Workers (UAW) from a collection of isolated local unions on the fringes of the industry into a major labor union, and led to the unionization of the domestic automobile industry.

Background

GM agreed to recognize the UAW as the bargaining agent for workers on February 2, 1937. The agreement was sent by a letter from Knudsen to Murphy in which the GM were agreed for a period of six month after work was resumed to not bargain or even enter into agreements with other employee organization, that letter was referred to the unions on January 4 unless the procedure was sanctioned by Gov. Murphy.  (p. 694)

The United Automobile Workers (UAW) labor union had only just been formed in 1935 and held its first convention in 1936. Shortly thereafter the union decided it could not survive by organizing campaigns at smaller plants as it had in the past. Instead they would organize automobile workers and go after the biggest and most powerful employer, General Motors Corporation. They would do this by focusing on their most valuable plants in Flint, Michigan. As stated by Henry Kraus, a UAW organizer of the strike, "It was the heart-and-nerve center of the vast combine. Creators of fortunes, incomparable benefactor to the chosen few, prize milch-cow of America's most patrician family, the du Ponts, whose 10,000,000 shares of GM stock assured them a one-fourth cut of the corporation's unabating profits, whatever happened in this central city of the corporation, in this non-descript over-size village, reverberated throughout the financial capitalists of the nation". The importance of these plants cannot be understated, the production plants in Flint were essential to the multiple lines of GM cars, and to the cars of GM's subsidiary companies like Chevrolet and Buick. As explained by Henry Kraus, "The great concentration of autoworkers in Flint was not at the body plants but at Chevrolet and Buick which employed 14,000 and 16,000 men respectively – the largest of all general Motors' 60-odd factories". Another Chevrolet factory,  Plant No. 4, would be critical to the sit-down strike as it produced the engines for all Chevrolet cars sold at the time. These plants were vital to production and strikes would cripple GM production throughout the country. The UAW recently separated from the much larger union, The American Federation of Labor (AFL). 

Organizing in Flint was a difficult and dangerous plan. GM controlled city politics in Flint and kept a close eye on outsiders. As Wyndham Mortimer, the first UAW officer put in charge of organizing the campaign in Flint, entered the town, he was noticed. The day after he entered Flint, in early June of 1936, he was being followed by people who were probably from the General Motors Company, "When he went through the front door, the other put his paper down and followed him out into the street. And thereafter, he or one of two others always managed to be with him".  

GM also maintained an extensive network of spies throughout its plants. Mortimer concluded after talking to Flint auto workers that the existing locals, which had only 122 members out of 45,000 auto workers in Flint, were riddled with spies. Accordingly, he decided that the only safe way to organize Flint was simply to bypass those locals. Mortimer, Eric Branoff, Roy Reuther, Henry Kraus, and Ralph Dale began meeting with Flint auto workers in their homes, keeping the names of new members a closely guarded secret from others in Flint and at UAW headquarters. 

As the UAW studied its target, it discovered that GM had only two factories that produced the dies from which car body components were stamped: one in Flint that produced the parts for Buicks, Pontiacs, and Oldsmobiles, and another in Cleveland that produced Chevrolet parts. The union planned to strike these plants after the New Year, when Frank Murphy would become Governor of Michigan.

The strike

Events forced the union to accelerate its plans when the workers at Cleveland's Fisher Body plant went on strike on December 28, 1936, due to two brothers being fired from the assembly line. The UAW immediately announced that it would not settle the Cleveland strike until it reached a national agreement with GM covering all of its plants. At the same time the union made plans to shut down Fisher #1 in Flint. Genora Johnson Dollinger was one of the main organizers and protester for the Flint sit-down. Robert Travis was the UAW organizer during the strike. On December 30, at 8:00 AM, the union learned that GM was planning to move the dies out of Fisher #1. UAW lead organizer Bob Travis immediately called a lunchtime  meeting at the union hall across the street from the plant, explained the situation, then sent the members across the street to occupy the plant. The Flint sit-down strike began.

In a conventional strike, union members leave the plant and establish a picket line to discourage other employees from entering, thus preventing the employer from operating. In a sit-down strike, the workers physically occupy the plant, keeping management and others out. By remaining inside the factory rather than picketing outside of it, striking workers prevented owners from bringing strikebreakers to resume production. It was in some ways easier to maintain the morale of participants in a sit-down than in a conventional strike. The strikers were removed from outside pressures and the hostility of the community that their action might have induced. Bad weather did not constitute a problem for sit-downers as it did for the pickets in an outside strike.

The Flint sit-down strikers set up their own civil system within the strike. A mayor and other civic officials were elected by the workers to maintain order within the plant.  Departments included Organized Recreation, Information, Postal Service, and Sanitation. All rules were enforced by what was called a "Kangaroo Court" by the workers. Any person who broke the rules was given a trial, and punishments ranged from washing dishes to expulsion from the plant (in the most extreme cases). It was important for the strikers to maintain order in the plant; if property damage occurred, the Governor would  intervene with the National Guard. In addition to maintaining order, the civic government also insured a steady stream of supplies from friendly vendors outside the plant. Most of the meals for the approximately 2,000 workers occupying the plant were provided free of charge by a diner across the street.

Resistance

The police, armed with guns and tear gas, attempted to enter the Fisher Body 2 plant on January 11, 1937. The strikers inside the plant pelted them with hinges, bottles, and bolts, led by Bob Travis and Roy Reuther. They were able to withstand several waves of attack, eventually ending the standoff. The strikers dubbed this "The Battle of Running Bulls", a mocking reference to the police ("bulls"). Fourteen strikers were injured by gunfire during the battle.

At the time, Vice President John Nance Garner supported federal intervention to break up the Flint Strike, but this idea was rejected by President Franklin D. Roosevelt. The president urged GM to recognize a union so the plants could re-open. 

GM obtained a second injunction against the strike on February 2, 1937. GM was granted the injunction by Judge Edward S. Black. Judge Black owned over three thousand shares of GM. Judge Black was disbarred from the case after the UAW found out about the revelation. The union not only ignored the order, but spread the strike to Chevrolet Plant #4. To avoid tipping its hand, the union let it be known in the hours before the move that it intended to go after another plant in the complex, changing directions only at the last minute. GM, tipped off by an informant within the UAW, was ready and waiting for the union at the other plant and caught completely off guard at Plant #4. The strike ended after 44 days.

That development forced GM to bargain with the union. John L. Lewis, President of the United Mine Workers and founder and leader of the Congress of Industrial Organizations, spoke for the UAW in those negotiations; UAW President Homer Martin was sent on a speaking tour to keep him out of the way. GM's representatives refused to be in the same room as the UAW's, so Governor Frank Murphy acted as courier and intermediary between the two groups. Governor Murphy sent in the Michigan National Guard, not to evict the strikers, but rather to protect them from the police and corporate strike-breakers. The two parties finally reached agreement on February 11, 1937, on a one-page agreement that recognized the UAW as the exclusive bargaining representative for GM's employees who were members of the union for the next six months.

Conclusion

As short as this agreement was, it gave the UAW instant legitimacy. The workers there also got a 5% increase in pay and were allowed to talk about the union during lunch. The UAW capitalized on that opportunity, signing up 100,000 GM employees and building the union's strength through grievance strikes at GM plants throughout the country. Several participants in the strike, including Charles I. Krause, went on to greater prominence within the union. Other notable participants in the sit-down strike were future D-Day hero and Greco-Roman wrestling champion Dean Rockwell, labor leader and future UAW president Walter Reuther, and the uncle of documentary filmmaker Michael Moore, whose debut feature Roger & Me contains a clip from the strike.

In the next year, UAW membership grew from 30,000 to 500,000 members. Employees of other car manufacturers such as Ford joined, as the entire industry was rapidly unionized.  As later noted by the BBC, "the strike was heard 'round the world". 

The GM sit-down strike of 1936–37 was, all in all, the most significant American labor conflict in the 20th century. When the UAW victory in the strike was followed by the capitulation of the United States Steel Corporation to the Steel Workers' Organizing Committee, the Financial Observer remarked that "an era of labor-management relations" had come to an end and "a new era" had begun.

See also

 With Babies and Banners: Story of the Women's Emergency Brigade, a 1979 documentary film

Footnotes

Further reading
Armstrong, Rudy, The History of UAW Local 659: we make our own history, Flint, Mich., UAW Local 659, 1993. 

 
 Fine, Sidney. "The General Motors Sit-Down Strike: A Re-examination,"American Historical Review (1965) 70#3 pp. 691–671 in JSTOR
  

 
 at JSTOR

 McCloud N. Brandi, Solidarity Forever: The Story of the Flint Sit-Down Strike and the Communist Party from the Perspective of the Rank and File Autoworkers, East Tennessee State, May 2012

External links

 Reuther Library Subject Focus: Remembering the Flint Sit-Down from the Walter P. Reuther Library
 Audio interviews with workers and other actors in the strike.
 Genora (Johnson) Dollinger Remembers the 1936-37 General Motors Sit-Down Strike
 Baulch, Vivian M.; Zacharias, Patricia (June 23, 1997). "Rearview Mirror: The historic 1936-37 Flint auto plant strikes". Detroit, Michigan: Detroit News. (PDF)
 Walter Linder. "How Industrial Unionism Was Won: The Great Flint Sit-Down Strike Against GM 1936-37"
 The Flint sit-down strike, 1936-1937 - Jeremy Brecher
 Workers Made History by Sitting Down on Job (LA Times)
 NPR Planet Money Podcast on the Flint site-down strike

1936 labor disputes and strikes
1937 labor disputes and strikes
1936 in the United States
1937 in the United States
Flint, Michigan
Labor disputes led by the United Auto Workers
1936 in Michigan
1937 in Michigan
Manufacturing industry labor disputes in the United States
Labor disputes in Michigan
General Motors labor relations
Walter Reuther